Naked Among Wolves is a novel by the East German author Bruno Apitz. The novel was first published in 1958 and tells the story of prisoners in the Buchenwald concentration camp who risk their lives to hide a young Polish-Jewish boy. Apitz himself had been imprisoned in Buchenwald as a communist from 1937 to 1945. The boy, whose name in the novel is Stefan Cyliak, was revealed to be based on Stefan Jerzy Zweig after publication of the novel.

The book has since been translated into 30 languages and published in 28 countries.

Adaptations
 In 1960 a first TV movie titled Nackt unter Wölfen was adapted for East German television.
 In 1963 the novel was adapted for a film, also titled Naked Among Wolves, by the East German director Frank Beyer.
 In 2015 an adaptation for TV was released, directed by Philipp Kadelbach.

See also
 Buchenwald Resistance

References

1958 German novels
East German novels
German historical novels
Novels about Nazi Germany
Novels about the Holocaust
German novels adapted into films